E-ACT is a multi-academy trust responsible for 28 academies in England.

As an academy trust, it is an exempt charity regulated by the Department for Education.

E-ACT splits its 28 academies into two regional clusters called 'North' and 'South', each of which is led by a regional education director and a regional operations director.

History
Until 2009 the Chief Executive of the Trust was Ian Comfort, who left his post alleging whistleblowing concerns, whilst the trust claimed "poor performance" issues. In March 2013 an audit by the UK Department for Education concluded that "boundaries between E-ACT and its subsidiary, E-ACT Enterprises Ltd (EEL) are blurred" (page 3), "activities undertaken by the subsidiary have been paid for with public funds and so appear irregular" (page 3), and "there has been a flow of public monies into EEL that cannot be said to directly benefit teaching and learning in E-ACT academies" (pages 12–13).

A 2011 Guardian article reported that in 2010 its director-general Sir Bruce Liddington had a salary package of £280,017. Sir Bruce Liddington resigned in 2013 after E-ACT received an official warning from the government regarding "financial mismanagement". The investigation report into E-ACT found that internal financial controls were weak, there was a culture of extravagant expenses, governance procedures were unusual, and that payments were made to trustees in a manner unusual for the charitable sector.

In 2014, the Department for Education removed E-ACT as sponsor from 10 academies after Ofsted inspectors raised serious concerns, noting extravagant spending on expenses and £393,000 of spending with "procedural irregularities" including on unapproved consultancy fees.

E-ACT Enterprises LTD was dissolved shortly after Sir Bruce Liddington's departure. In addition, E-ACT has made considerable changes to its previous administration practices (including reducing back office costs by 73%) as audited in its public accounts and the salary of its subsequent CEO, David Moran, reduced significantly.

In January 2016, E-ACT moved to a centralised process for monitoring standards. There is now a single central governing body covering all academies in the group across the country. Ambassadorial Advisory Groups were introduced at a local academy level.

In 2017, E-ACT introduced a mental health first aid programme, aiming to train every member of staff to understand and recognise the early warning signs of mental health problems in pupils. E-ACT also announced plans to pioneer a pupil-led mental health curriculum in all its schools.

In August 2019, David Moran stepped down as CEO. When he joined the organisation in 2013, 17% of E-ACT’s academies were rated good or outstanding by Ofsted. By the time of his departure, that figure was over 70%. E-ACT's Board of Trustees announced Deputy CEO Jane Millward as David’s successor.

Academies

Primary
E-ACT Blackley Academy
Badock's Wood E-ACT Academy
Braintcroft E-ACT Academy
Chalfont Valley E-ACT Primary Academy
Denham Green E-ACT Primary Academy
Greenfield E-ACT Primary Academy
Hareclive Academy
Ilminster Avenue E-ACT Academy
Mansfield Green E-ACT Primary Academy
Merritts Brook E-ACT Primary Academy
Nechells Primary E-ACT Academy
Pathways E-ACT Academy
Perry Court E-ACT Academy
Reedswood E-ACT Primary Academy
St Ursula’s E-ACT Academy

Secondary
Bourne End Academy
City Heights E-ACT Academy
Heartlands Academy
North Birmingham Academy
The Oldham Academy North
The Parker E-ACT Academy
Parkwood E-ACT Academy
E-ACT Crest Academy
E-ACT Royton and Crompton Academy
Shenley Academy
West Walsall E-ACT Academy
Willenhall E-ACT Academy

All-through
Danetre and Southbrook Learning Village

Academies previously sponsored

Primary
Aldborough E-ACT Free School (to 31 May 2014) (now sponsored by Loxford School Trust), with effect from 1 June 2014. The school is now known as Aldborough Primary School.
Hartsbrook E-ACT Free School (to 31 August 2014) (now sponsored by Lion Education Trust), with effect from 1 September 2014. The school was closed on 31 August 2014, and re-opened on 1 September 2014 as Brook House Primary School.

Secondary
E-ACT Leeds East Academy (to 31 August 2014) (now sponsored by White Rose Academies Trust), with effect from 1 September 2014. The school is now known as Leeds East Academy.
Leeds West Academy (to 31 August 2014) (now sponsored by White Rose Academies Trust), with effect from 1 September 2014.
Forest E-ACT Academy (to 28 February 2015), now sponsored by SGS Academy Trust, with effect from 1 March 2015. The school is now known as The Forest High School.
Sherwood E-ACT Academy (to 31 March 2015) (now sponsored by Redhill Academy Trust). E-ACT was the sponsor until the end of March 2015. The school was then known as Sherwood Academy. The Redhill Academy Trust sponsored the school until Summer 2016, when the school site closed permanently.
The Purston E-ACT Academy (to 31 August 2014) (now sponsored by The Rodillian Multi-Academy Trust), with effect from 1 September 2014. The school is now known as The Featherstone Academy.
Trent Valley Academy (to 31 May 2014) (now sponsored by The Lincoln College Group), with effect from 1 June 2014. The school is now known as The Gainsborough Academy.
The Winsford E-ACT Academy (to 31 August 2014) (now sponsored by The Fallibroome Multi-Academy Trust), with effect from 1 September 2014. The school is now known as The Winsford Academy.

All-through
Dartmouth Academy (to 31 August 2014) (now sponsored by Kingsbridge Academy Trust), with effect from 1 September 2014. Nick Hindmarsh, Principal has said that: "The name of the trust will change following a consultation exercise across the schools’ communities".

References